Clivina ferrea is a species of ground beetle in the subfamily Scaritinae. It was described by John Lawrence LeConte in 1857.

References

ferrea
Beetles described in 1857